Hulme Barracks was a military installation in Hulme, Manchester, England.

History
The barracks were built in the Georgian-style and completed in 1804. They became home to the 15th The King's Hussars, who charged protesters in Manchester in what became known as the Peterloo Massacre in 1819. The barracks were used to house infantry battalions from 1895 until their sale to Manchester Corporation in 1914. The building that remains today is the former officers' mess, officers' quarters and quartermaster's house, the other structures on the site having been demolished. Now converted into flats, Hulme Barracks was designated a Grade II listed building on 16 November 1978.

See also

Listed buildings in Manchester-M15

References

Grade II listed buildings in Manchester
Installations of the British Army
Barracks in England